Severny (Russian: Северный, 'northern') (masculine), Severnaya (Северная) (feminine), or Severnoye (Северное) (neutral) may refer to:

People
Andrei Severny (astronomer) (1913–1987), Soviet astronomer
Andrei Severny (filmmaker) (born 1977), Russian filmmaker and photographer
Arkady Severny (1939–1980), performer of Russian criminal songs
Count and Countess Severny, pseudonyms of Tsar Paul I of Russia and Tsaritsa Maria Feodorovna

Places
Severny District, several districts and city districts in Russia
Severny Okrug (disambiguation), various divisions in Russia
Severny Urban Settlement, several municipal urban settlements in Russia
Severny (inhabited locality) (Severnaya, Severnoye), several inhabited localities in Russia
Severny Island, Russia
Severny (volcano), a volcano on the Kamchatka Peninsula, Russia
Severny (air base), Orsk, Russia
Severny Airport, Novosibirsk, Russia
Severny mine, a copper mine in Murmansk Oblast, Russia

Other uses
Severny (grape), a Russian red-grape variety
1737 Severny, an asteroid
Severnaya, a fictional location in the film GoldenEye

See also

Severní, a settlement in the Czech Republic
Severn (disambiguation)
Northern (disambiguation)
Severnaya Zemlya, an island group in Russia
Yuzhny (disambiguation) ('southern')